The Capitol Years is a 1990 compilation album of the U.S. singer Frank Sinatra.

Released to coincide with Sinatra's 75th birthday, this three-disc set has an abundance of classic Sinatra performances from his career with Capitol Records, which spanned the years 1953 to 1961.

Track listing

Disc one
"I've Got the World on a String" (Harold Arlen, Ted Koehler) - 2:10
Recorded on April 30, 1953
"Lean Baby" (Roy Alfred, Billy May) - 2:33
Recorded on April 2, 1953
"I Love You" (Harry Archer, Harlan Thompson) - 2:27
"South of the Border" (Jimmy Kennedy, Michael Carr) – 2:50
Recorded on April 30, 1953
"From Here to Eternity" (Freddie Karger, Robert Wells) - 2:59
Recorded on May 2, 1953
"They Can't Take That Away from Me" (George Gershwin, Ira Gershwin) - 1:57
Recorded on November 5, 1953
"I Get a Kick Out of You" (Cole Porter) - 2:53
Recorded on November 6, 1953
"Young at Heart" (Carolyn Leigh, Johnny Richards) - 2:59
Recorded on December 9, 1953
"Three Coins in the Fountain" (Jule Styne, Sammy Cahn) - 3:04
Recorded on March 1, 1954
"All of Me" (Gerald Marks, Seymour Simons) - 2:07
"Taking a Chance on Love" (Vernon Duke, Ted Fetter, John Latouche) - 2:19
Recorded on April 19, 1954
"Someone to Watch Over Me" (G. Gershwin, I. Gershwin) - 2:56
Recorded on September 23, 1954
"What Is This Thing Called Love?" (Porter) - 2:35
Recorded on February 16, 1955
"In the Wee Small Hours of the Morning" (Bob Hilliard, David Mann) - 2:59
Recorded on February 17, 1954
"Learnin' the Blues" (Delores Vicki Silvers) - 3:00
Recorded on March 23, 1955
"Our Town" (Cahn, Jimmy Van Heusen) - 3:15
"Love and Marriage" (Cahn, Van Heusen) - 2:38
Recorded on August 15, 1955
"(Love Is) The Tender Trap" (Cahn, Van Heusen) - 2:57
Recorded on September 13, 1955
"Weep They Will" (Bill Carey, Carey Fischer) - 3:16
Recorded on October 17, 1955
"I Thought About You" (Van Heusen, Johnny Mercer)  – 2:30
"You Make Me Feel So Young" (Josef Myrow, Mack Gordon) – 2:57
"Memories of You" (Andy Razaf, Eubie Blake) - 2:53
Recorded on January 9, 1956
"I've Got You Under My Skin" (Porter) - 3:43
Recorded on January 12, 1956
"Too Marvelous for Words" (Mercer, Richard A. Whiting) - 2:27
Recorded on January 16, 1956
"Don't Like Goodbyes" (Harold Arlen, Truman Capote) - 4:50
Recorded on March 8, 1956
"(How Little It Matters) How Little We Know" (Leigh, Philip Springer) - 2:39
Recorded on April 5, 1956

Disc two
"Hey! Jealous Lover" (Sammy Cahn, Kay Twomey, Bee Walker) - 2:21
Recorded on April 9, 1956
"You're Sensational" (Porter) - 2:16
Recorded on April 5, 1956
"Close to You" (Al Hoffman, Carl G. Lampl, Jerry Livingston) - 3:56
Recorded on November 1, 1956
"Stars Fell on Alabama" (Mitchell Parish, Frank Perkins) - 2:35
"I Got Plenty Of Nothing" (G. Gershwin, I. Gershwin, Dubose Heyward) - 3:14
Recorded on November 15, 1956
"I Wish I Were in Love Again" (Richard Rodgers, Lorenz Hart) - 2:28
Recorded on November 20, 1956
"The Lady Is a Tramp" (Rodgers, Hart) - 3:14
"Night and Day" (Porter) - 3:59
"The Lonesome Road" (Gene Austin, Nat Shilkret) - 3:53
"If I Had You" (Jimmy Campbell, Reginald Connelly, Ted Shapiro) - 2:35
Recorded on November 26, 1956
"Where Are You?" (Harold Adamson, Jimmy McHugh) – 3:30
"I'm a Fool to Want You" (Frank Sinatra, Jack Wolf, Joel Herron) – 4:51
Recorded on May 1, 1957
"Witchcraft" (Cy Coleman, Carolyn Leigh) - 2:52
"Something Wonderful Happens in Summer" (Joe Bushkin, John DeVries) - 3:12
Recorded on May 20, 1957
"All the Way" (Cahn, Van Heusen) - 2:52
"Chicago (That Toddlin' Town)" (Fred Fisher) - 2:12
Recorded on August 13, 1957
"Let's Get Away from It All" (Matt Dennis, Tom Adair)  – 2:11
Recorded on October 1, 1957
"Autumn in New York" (Vernon Duke)  – 4:37
Recorded on October 3, 1957
"Come Fly with Me" (Cahn, Van Heusen)  – 3:19
Recorded on October 8, 1957
"Everybody Loves Somebody" (Sam Coslow, Ken Lane, Irving Taylor) - 3:42
"It's the Same Old Dream" (Cahn, Styne) - 3:02
Recorded on November 25, 1957
"Put Your Dreams Away (For Another Day)" (Ruth Lowe, Paul Mann, George David Weiss) - 3:12
Recorded on December 11, 1957
"Here Goes" (Otto Cesana, Cahn) - 2:42
Recorded on March 3, 1958
"Angel Eyes" (Earl Brent, Matt Dennis) - 3:44
Recorded on May 29, 1957

Disc three
"Ebb Tide" (Robert Maxwell, Carl Sigman) - 3:18
"Guess I'll Hang My Tears Out to Dry" (Cahn, Styne) - 3:59
"Only the Lonely" (Cahn, Van Heusen) - 4:31
Recorded on May 29, 1958
"One For My Baby (And One More For The Road)" (Arlen, Mercer) - 4:04
Recorded on June 26, 1958
"To Love and Be Loved" (Cahn, Van Heusen) - 2:56
"I Couldn't Care Less" (Cahn, Van Heusen) - 2:58
Recorded on October 15, 1958
"The Song Is You" (Oscar Hammerstein II, Jerome Kern) - 2:42
"Just In Time" (Betty Comden, Adolph Green, Styne) - 2:23
Recorded on December 9, 1958
"Saturday Night (Is the Loneliest Night of the Week)" (Cahn, Styne) - 1:54
Recorded on December 22, 1958
"Come Dance With Me" (Cahn, Van Heusen) - 2:59
Recorded on December 23, 1958
"French Foreign Legion" (Aaron Schroeder, Guy Wood) - 2:01
Recorded on December 29, 1958
"The One I Love (Belongs to Somebody Else)" (Isham Jones, Gus Kahn) - 3:03
"Here's That Rainy Day" (Johnny Burke, Van Heusen) - 4:19
Recorded on March 25, 1959
"High Hopes" (Cahn, Van Heusen) - 2:42
Recorded on May 8, 1959
"When No One Cares" (Cahn, Van Heusen) - 2:42
"I'll Never Smile Again" (Ruth Lowe) - 3:43
Recorded on May 14, 1959
"I've Got a Crush on You" (G. Gershwin, I. Gershwin) - 2:16
"Embraceable You" (G. Gershwin, I. Gershwin) - 3:23
Recorded on March 3, 1960
"Nice 'N' Easy" (Alan Bergman, Marilyn Keith, Lew Spence) - 2:45
Recorded on April 13, 1960
"I Can't Believe That You're In Love With Me" (Clarence Gaskill, McHugh) - 2:25
Recorded on August 23, 1960
"On the Sunny Side of the Street" (Dorothy Fields, McHugh) - 2:41
Recorded on March 20, 1961
"I've Heard That Song Before" (Cahn, Styne) - 2:30
Recorded on March 21, 1961
"Almost Like Being In Love" (Alan Jay Lerner, Frederick Loewe) - 2:02
Recorded on March 22, 1960
"I'll Be Seeing You" (Sammy Fain, Irving Kahal) - 2:46
Recorded on September 11, 1961
"I Gotta Right to Sing the Blues" (Arlen, Koehler) - 2:58
Recorded on March 6, 1962

Personnel
 Frank Sinatra – vocals
 Gordon Jenkins – arranger, conductor
 Skip Martin – arranger
 Billy May – arranger, conductor
 Nelson Riddle – arranger, conductor
 Felix Slatkin – conductor
 Axel Stordahl – conductor
 Heinie Beau – arranger
 Ron Furmanek – box set compiler and producer

Charts

References

1990 compilation albums
Frank Sinatra compilation albums
Capitol Records compilation albums